The West Bank Premier League 2008–09 season was won by Wadi Al-Nes while Al-Arabi and Ittihad Nablus were relegated. The top ten teams qualified for Division A, while the next ten teams qualified for Division B.

After the regular season a tie on points for 10th place was decided in a one leg play-off. Shabab Al-Khalil won the match against Markaz Askar by 2-1.

Final league table

Notes:

Askar and Balata are refugee camps in the Nablus Governorate;

Al-Am'ari is a refugee camp in the Ramallah and al-Bireh Governorate;

Ariha is the Arabic name for Jericho;

Al-Khalil is the Arabic name for Hebron;

Al-Quds is the Arabic name for Jerusalem

References

External links
Season at goalzz.com
Season at RSSSF

West Bank Premier League seasons
1
West